The Government of Brunei is the union government created by the constitution of Brunei where by the Sultan of Brunei is both head of state and head of government (Prime Minister of Brunei). Executive power is exercised by the government. Brunei has a legislative council with 36 appointed members, that only has consultative tasks. Under Brunei's 1959 constitution, His Majesty Hassanal Bolkiah, is the head of state with full executive authority, including emergency powers since 1962. The Sultan's role is enshrined in the national philosophy known as "Melayu Islam Beraja" (MIB), or Malay Islamic Monarchy. The country has been under hypothetical martial law since a rebellion occurred in the early 1960s and was put down by British troops from Singapore. The Seat of the Government is located in Bandar Seri Begawan, Brunei.

Executive branch 
The Sultan is the head of state and head of government in Brunei. He exercises absolute powers and full executive authority under the framework of the 1959 Constitution. The Sultan is advised by and presides over five councils, which he appoints. The five councils are the Privy Council, Council of Succession, Religious Council, Council of Ministers and the Legislative Council.

Privy Council 
According to the Constitution, the Privy Council advises the Sultan in the matters concerning the exercise of authority of mercy and the amendment or revocation of provisions in the Constitution. The council also advises the Sultan on the conferring of Malay customary ranks, titles and honours. It also performs functions such as proclaiming a succession of regency. Members of the Privy Council include members of the royal family and senior government officials.

Council of Succession 
The Council of Succession determines succession to the throne should that need arise. The order of succession is determined by the Constitution.

Religious Council 
The Religious Council, known in full as the Brunei Islamic Religious Council (BIRC) advises the Sultan on all matters pertaining to Islam. The body in charge of Islamic administration policy. Policies determined by the council are executed by the Ministry of Religious Affairs.

Members of the Religious Council include government ministers, a pengiran cheteria, pehin manteris, state mufti, the Attorney General, the Syarie Chief Justice and additional members appointed by the Sultan.

Council of Ministers 

A Council of Ministers, or cabinet, which currently consists of nine members (including the Sultan himself as Prime Minister), perform the day-to-day administrative functions of government.

Legislative branch 

Under the 1959 constitution  there was an elected Legislative Council, but only one election has ever been held, in 1962. Soon after that election, the assembly was dissolved following the declaration of a state of emergency, which saw the banning of the Brunei People's Party. In 1970 the Council was changed to an appointed body by decree of the Sultan. In 2004 the Sultan announced that for the next parliament, 15 of the 20 seats would be elected. However, no date for the election has been set.

Since 13 January 2017, the Council has 33 members, including 13 cabinet ministers.

Judicial branch 
Brunei has a dual legal system. The first is the system inherited from the British, similar to the ones found in India, Malaysia and Singapore. It is based on the English common law, but with codification of a significant part of it. The common law legal system covers most of Brunei's laws.

The structure of the common law courts in Brunei starts with the magistracy. There are currently less than 10 magistrates for the country, all of whom are locals. A rung above the magistracy is the intermediate courts. This was set up to be a training ground for the local. There are currently two intermediate court judges, both are locals.

The High Court of the Supreme Court currently consist of three judges, two of whom are locals. The Chief Justice is a High Court of Hong Kong judge.

There is no jury system in Brunei; a judge or magistrate sits alone to hear a case except for capital punishment cases where two High Court judges will sit.

The Court of Appeal of the Supreme Court consists of three Judges, all of whom are currently retired British judges. The Court of Appeal sits twice a year for about a month each time.

Appeals to the Judicial Committee of the Privy Council in the United Kingdom in criminal cases are no longer available, whilst still retaining a very limited right of appeal to the J.C.P.C. in civil cases.

The other system of justice in Brunei is the shariah courts. It deals mainly in Muslim divorce and matters ancillary to a Muslim divorce in its civil jurisdiction and in the offences of khalwat (close proximity) and zina (adultery) amongst Muslims.

The shariah court structure is similar to the common law court structure except that it has no intermediate court and that the Court of Appeal is the final court of appeal.

All magistrates and judges in both the common law courts and the shariah courts are appointed by the Government. All local magistrates and judges were appointed from the civil service with none thus far being appointed from private practice.

Territorial disputes 
The sovereignty of the Territory of Limbang has been an ongoing issue between Brunei and Malaysia.  It was reported in 2009 that a solution "was achieved between the two governments, when Brunei dropped all claims to Limbang, thus recognising it as a Malaysian territory". These reports, however, were dismissed by Brunei's former second minister of Foreign Affairs and Trade on 18 March 2009, who clarified that the claim on Limbang was never discussed [with Malaysia].  What was discussed between both countries was the demarcation of land boundaries on the whole.  

Brunei is one of many nations that lay claim to the disputed Spratly Islands, several small islands situated between Brunei and Labuan, Malaysia which include Kuraman Island.  They are contested between Brunei and Malaysia, but are internationally recognised as part of the latter.

See also 

 Culture of Brunei
 Politics of Brunei

References

External links 

 official website

Government of Brunei